KafarKila (also, Kfarkila, Kfarkela, Kafarkela) is a village in Southern Lebanon.

Kafarkila name means "The village of the pasturage".

History
Al-Maqdisi  (c. 945/946 – 991) noted that Kafr Kila (called Kafar Kila) was "A place lying a day's march from Tabariyyah".

Ottoman era
In the 1596 tax records, it was named as a village,  Kafr Kuk, in the Ottoman nahiya (subdistrict) of Tibnin, part of   Safad Sanjak, with a population of 31  households and 2 bachelors, all Muslim. The villagers paid taxes on  agricultural products, such as wheat, barley, olive trees, goats, beehives and winter pastures; a total of 4,700 akçe.

In 1838, Eli Smith noted Kafr Kila's population as Metawileh.

In 1875 Victor Guérin visited and noted that the village had about 1,000 Metawileh inhabitants. He further noted: "The mosque and several of the houses are built of old materials. The spring is partly ancient."

In 1881, the PEF's Survey of Western Palestine (SWP) described it as "a village, built of stone and mud, containing about 150 Moslems, situated on sloping ground, with figs, olives, and arable land around. A good spring near."

Modern era
Following the 1982 Israeli invasion Kafr Kila became part of their “security zone”. On 11 September 1989 three IDF soldiers were wounded in an ambush in Kafr Kila. The Lebanese Communist Party claimed responsibility. Two of the attackers were killed.

The total population of the village is about 14,500. The occupants' number increases dramatically during summer. Its altitude is around 700 m from sea level. Kafarkila is well known for its high quality olive oil, grapes, and bee honey in addition to many other farming activities.

Many developments are currently taking place due to the efforts and the determination of the municipality side by side with the people in order to mitigate the problems that accumulated over the years from central government indifference, civil war, occupation and border wars.

Kafr Kela is home to a Hezbollah military base complete with fighters, about 20 arms depots, fighting positions and observation posts. The first Hezbollah tunnel the Israel Defense Forces (IDF) found near Metula came out of Kafr Kela. Dozens of Hezbollah members live in the village among the civilian population.

References

Bibliography

External links
Survey of Western Palestine, Map 2:   IAA, Wikimedia commons
Kfar Kila, Localiban
www.kafarkila.net

Populated places in the Israeli security zone 1985–2000
Populated places in Marjeyoun District
Shia Muslim communities in Lebanon